Frederick Hall, who used the alias William Williams was a runaway African American slave who enlisted as a private in the U.S. Army during the War of 1812 and died from a mortal wound while defending Fort McHenry from the British naval bombardment in 1814.

Early life

U.S. Army service in War of 1812
He escaped his master from Bellefields Plantation (Sim's Delight), Croom, Prince George's County, Maryland in early 1814; despite the standing British offer of freedom and land to any escaped slave who joined the British army or navy, Williams enlisted in the United States Army in mid 1814.  He was assigned to the 38th U.S. Infantry in Baltimore and received an enlistment bonus of $50, and wages of $8 per month.

Death
In September 1814, during the British artillery bombardment on Fort McHenry, Private William Williams was mortally wounded when a cannonball blew off his leg. He died two months later in a Baltimore hospital.

See also 
Fort McHenry

References

External links 
 William Williams and the Battle of Baltimore

Date of birth missing
Place of birth missing
American military personnel killed in the War of 1812
19th-century American slaves
19th-century American people
People from Maryland in the War of 1812
1814 deaths
People from Prince George's County, Maryland